Sam Wolstenholme may refer to:
 Sam Wolstenholme (footballer)
 Sam Wolstenholme (rugby union)